Lamentations 4 is the fourth chapter of the Book of Lamentations in the Hebrew Bible or the Old Testament of the Christian Bible, part of the Ketuvim ("Writings"). This book contains the elegies of the prophet Jeremiah. In this chapter, Zion mourns her misery and confesses her sins; great miseries are recorded: women killed their own children, the sins of the false prophets and priests; the king was taken prisoner. In the final verses, Edom is threatened, but is Zion comforted.

Text
The original text was written in Hebrew language. This chapter is divided into 22 verses.

The chapter is acrostic, divided into 22 stanzas or verses. The stanzas consist of triplets of lines, each beginning with the letters of the Hebrew alphabet in regular order (twenty-two in number).

Textual versions
Some early witnesses for the text of this chapter in Hebrew are of the Masoretic Text, which includes Codex Leningradensis (1008). Fragments containing parts of this chapter were found among the Dead Sea Scrolls including 5Q6 (5QLama; 50 CE) with extant verses 5‑8, 11‑16, 19‑22; and 5Q7 (5QLamb; 30 BCE‑50 CE) with extant verses 17‑20.

There is also a translation into Koine Greek known as the Septuagint, made in the last few centuries BCE. Extant ancient manuscripts of the Septuagint version include Codex Vaticanus (B; B; 4th century), Codex Alexandrinus (A; A; 5th century) and Codex Marchalianus (Q; Q; 6th century).

Verse 1
 How is the gold become dim!
 how is the most fine gold changed!
 the stones of the sanctuary are poured out
 in the top of every street.
 "How" (Hebrew, Eichah): the title of the collection repeated here, and in Lamentations 2:1.
 "Gold": the "splendid adornment of the temple" [Calvin]; or, the "principal men of Judea" [Grotius] (Lamentations 4:2).
, "your sons, O Zion") to "the stones of a crown." However, it was expressed in an earlier lamentation that the young children "fainted for hunger in the top of every street" (Lamentations 2:19). The stones can also refer to the gems on the breastplate of the high priest; or, metaphorically, the priests and Levites. The Jerusalem Bible also argues that both the gold and the stones "are the people of Jerusalem".

Verse 2
 The precious sons of Zion,
 comparable to fine gold,
 how are they esteemed as earthen pitchers,
 the work of the hands of the potter!
 "The precious sons of Zion": The whole nation was consecrated to God, and formed "a kingdom of priests" ; in this respect, a type of the Christian Church .
 "earthen pitchers" see ; .
 "The work of the hands of the potter": as earthen vessels with respect to their bodies, "frail, weak, and mortal"; but they are the work of God's hands, particularly as new creatures, and are a piece of his workmanship, and so valuable to him (see ).

Verse 3
Even the jackals present their breasts
To nurse their young;
But the daughter of my people is cruel,
Like ostriches in the wilderness.
"Daughter" in the Hebrew text but "daughters" in the Septuagint.

Verse 6
For the punishment of the iniquity of the daughter of my people
is greater than the punishment of the sin of Sodom,
that was overthrown as in a moment,
and no hands stayed on her.
"And no hands stayed on her" (NKJV: "With no hand to help her!"): An alternative ending based on the Septuagint is "no time for a man to wring his hands".

Verses 16–17
In , two initial letters, "Ayin" and "Pe", are transposed. This is found is three instances in the whole book (Lamentations 2:16–17; 3:46–51; and here). Grotius thinks the reason for the inversion of two of the Hebrew letters, is that the Chaldeans, like the Arabians, used a different order from the Hebrews; in the first Elegy (chapter), Jeremiah speaks as a Hebrew, in the following ones, as one subject to the Chaldeans, but Fausset thinks it is doubtful.

See also
Jacob
Judah
Jerusalem
Zion
Related Bible parts: Isaiah 30, Lamentations 1, Lamentations 2

Notes

References

Sources

External links

Jewish
Lamentations 4 Hebrew with Parallel English
Lamentations 4 Hebrew with Rashi's Commentary

Christian
Lamentations 4 English Translation with Parallel Latin Vulgate

04